The World Innovation, Technology and Services Alliance (WITSA) is a consortium of associations from the information and communications technology (ICT) industry around the world.  The group claims that it represents over 90% of the world ICT market through its global membership, and has a goal of advancing the growth and development of the ICT industry.  WITSA was founded in 1978 as the World Computing Services Industry Association, and participates in advocacy in international public policy that affects the "global information infrastructure".  It voices the concerns of the international IT industry in organizations such as the World Trade Organization, the Organisation for Economic Co-operation and Development, and the G7.

WITSA represents IT industry associations in over 80 countries or economies. WITSA's motto is "Fulfilling the Promise of the Digital Age".

WITSA World Innovation, Technology and Services Alliance elected the 2020-2022 chairman and board of directors on November 17, 2020, and Yannis Sirros, then a member of the Greek Federation of Information Technology and Communication Enterprises (SEPE), was elected as the new chairman

World Congress on Innovation and Technology(WCIT) 
2022, Penang, Malaysia
2021, Dhaka, Bangladesh
2020, Penang, Malaysia
2019, Yerevan, Armenia
2018, Hyderabad, India
2017, Taipei, Taiwan
2016, Brasilia, Brazil
2014, Guadalajara, Mexico
2012, Montreal, Canada
2010, Amsterdam, The Netherlands
2008, Kuala Lumpur, Malaysia
2006, Austin, Texas, USA
2004, Athens, Greece
2002, Adelaide, Australia
2000, Taipei, Taiwan
1998, Fairfax, Virginia, USA
1996, Bilbao, Spain
1994, Yokohama, Japan 	
1992, London, England
1990, Washington D.C., USA
1988, Paris, France
1986, Toronto, Canada
1984, Tokyo, Japan
1982, Copenhagen, Denmark
1980, San Francisco, California, USA
1978, Barcelona, Spain

For additional information regarding the WCIT, see the "WCIT - A Proud History" document [PDF]

Other programs and events

WITSA Global Innovation and Tech Excellence Awards 
The WITSA Global Innovation and Tech Excellence Awards  honor achievements in the application of information technology around the globe. Winners have exhibited excellence in one of the following categories: Digital Opportunity/Inclusion Award, Smart Cities Award, Sustainable Growth/Circular Economy Award, Innovative eHealth Solutions Award, Public/Private Partnership Award, E-Education & Learning Award, Emerging Digital Solutions Award, and Startup Ecosystem Award. A Chairman's Award is presented to a nominee selected from the entire pool of candidates from all awards categories. The award ceremonies are a signature event of the proceedings at the World Congress on Innovation and Technology.

See also
Information and communications technology
WCIT 2019
Health information technology
Information technology

References

 [WITSA Elects New Leadership for the 2020-22 Term: Selects Mr. Yannis Sirros as its First Chairman from Europe https://witsa.org/witsa-elects-new-leadership-for-the-2020-22-term-selects-mr-yannis-sirros-as-its-first-chairman-from-europe/]
 [Greek Scientist Elected Chairman of Global IT Flagship Organization https://greece.greekreporter.com/2020/11/18/greek-scientist-appointed-chairman-of-global-it-flagship-organization/]

External links
 Official website of WITSA
 WITSA Global Innovation and Tech awards 2022
 Past WITSA Award Winners
 WITSA Eminent Persons Award winners
 WITSA white papers
 WITSA newsletter
 WCIT 2022, Penang, Malaysia

Organizations established in 1978
International professional associations
Information technology lobbying organizations
International organizations based in the United States
1978 establishments in the United States